Marc García Ferrándiz (born 1 November 1999) is a Spanish professional motorcycle racer. He won the inaugural Supersport 300 World Championship in 2017.

Career
In 2014, García made his debut in the Red Bull MotoGP Rookies Cup, a category he competed in until 2016. Furthermore, in 2015 and 2016 he occasionally participated in the Campeonato de España de Velocidad Moto3, with the bike built by the Monlau Repsol Technical School. In 2017, he competed with the Halcourier Racing team in the Supersport 300 World Championship, winning the title by one point over Alfonso Coppola. After the championship he took part in the last race, on the Valencia Circuit, of the Spanish national championship in the Moto3 class. In 2018 he continued his experience in the CEV Moto3 by participating as a starting rider, together with his teammate Davide Pizzoli, on board the Mahindra of the Max Racing Team, Max Biaggi's team.

In 2019, García returned to the Supersport 300 World Championship, with David Salom's DS Junior team, winning a Grand Prix and ending the season in sixth place in the drivers' standings. In 2020, he returned to the SS300 from mid-season, as a replacement rider with a Kawasaki Ninja 400 of the 2R team. He had one win and a third-place finish, closing the season in sixteenth place. He continued with the same team in 2021 as a starting driver, during the season he moved to the Prodina Ircos team as a replacement driver. he scored twenty-six points and finished the season in twenty-fourth place. In the same season he disputed two events at Misano and at Mugello in the Supersport 300 class of the Italian Speed championship, scoring thirty-eight points and finishing sixteenth. In 2022, he was the starting rider in the SS300 with the Yamaha MS Racing team. He won three races and remained in the running for the title for a good part of the season, eventually finishing in fourth place. In the same season he made his debut in the World Championship where competed in the British Grand Prix in the Moto 3 category. He replaced the injured Joel Kelso, finishing in twenty-second place.

References

External links

1999 births
Living people
Sportspeople from Terrassa
Motorcycle racers from Catalonia
Spanish motorcycle racers
Spanish sportsmen
Supersport 300 World Championship riders
Moto3 World Championship riders